Status Quo are an English rock band. Formed as The Scorpions in 1962 at Sedgehill Comprehensive School, Catford, by schoolboys Francis Rossi, Alan Lancaster, Jess Jaworski and Alan Key, the group has had a career spanning almost 60 years, with Rossi remaining as a consistent member, and the only remaining member of the original "Scorpions" lineup.

History

The Scorpions, The Spectres, Traffic Jam and (The) Status Quo (1962-1970)
The group that would become known as Status Quo was formed in 1962 as "The Scorpions". The members met while playing together in the school orchestra at Sedgehill Comprehensive School in Catford, London, and consisted of Francis Rossi on guitar and lead vocals, Alan Lancaster on bass, Jess Jaworski on keyboards and Alan Key on drums. According to Rossi, the group was Key's idea, and they would practice in Jaworski's bedroom, playing covers such as The Shadows' version of Jerry Lordan's "Apache, "Wake Up Little Susie" by The Everly Brothers and The Beatles' "Love Me Do". Rossi has remained in the group up until the present day, making him the group's longest-serving member, and the only remaining original member. Lancaster would remain in the group until 1985, returning briefly for reunion concerts in 2013 and 14.

Key was replaced by air cadets drummer John Coghlan the next year in 1963, although Rossi maintains that Key had left at an earlier time to get married, and was replaced by a short-lived drummer named "Barry", who was ousted by the band in favour of Coghlan, whom they preferred as a drummer. Coghlan would remain in the group until 1981, and, like Lancaster, would later return for a reunion tour in 2013-14.

In 1965, after finishing school, Jaworski left the group to seek employment outside of the music industry. Pat Barlow, the band's manager at the time, replaced Jaworski with organist Roy Lynes.  The Spectres released two singles: a cover of "I (Who Have Nothing)" and the Lancaster-penned "Hurdy Gurdy Man", but neither charted. 

While playing a stint at Butlin's Holiday Camp in Minehead, the band formed a friendship with future Quo rhythm guitarist and vocalist Rick Parfitt, then known as Ricky Harrison, performing with a cabaret trio called The Highlights. Parfitt would join the band in August 1967 on the instruction of Pat Barlow, who suggested that the group needed a new singer. The same year, The Spectres changed their name again to "Traffic Jam". They initially wanted to call themselves "Traffic", but were unable to due to a dispute with Steve Winwood who had also registered the name for his own group. Later, the group would change its name again, to "The Status Quo". Parfitt would remain in the group until his death in 2016, making him the longest-serving member of the group thus far next to Rossi. This lineup saw the group's first charting single in "Pictures of Matchstick Men" which would appear on the album Picturesque Matchstickable Messages from the Status Quo (both 1968). The lineup went on to release two more albums, now known as "Status Quo" (dropping the definite article): Spare Parts (1969) and Ma Kelly's Greasy Spoon (1970), as well as the single "Down the Dustpipe" (1970), which reached number 12 in the UK charts.

Rossi, Lancaster, Coghlan and Parfitt (the "Frantic Four") (1970–1981, 2013–2014)
In 1970, Lynes left the band. In his 2019 autobiography, Rossi states that Lynes had decided to get married; that they were "on [their] way to a gig in Aberdeen when he jumped ship somewhere around Stoke-on-Trent". The band would continue as a four-piece without a keyboardist (though they would later hire Andy Bown as an additional musician on keyboards from 1976).

The four-man lineup's first release was the single "In My Chair" in late 1970, which reached number 21 in the UK, with the first album from this lineup, Dog of Two Head, following in 1971. Ten more studio albums would follow, the last being 1981's Never Too Late. They also released a UK top-10 charting non-album single "The Wild Side of Life" in 1976, and a live album in 1977. This lineup is considered to be the band's "classic" lineup by many fans, having overseen the release of many of their early hits such as "Caroline", "Down Down", "Rockin' All Over The World" and "Whatever You Want". Due to its emphasis on hard rock as opposed to the psychedelic direction of the '60s and the pop rock records of the group's future, this lineup is often referred to as "The Frantic Four". They would often be joined on stage by road manager and songwriter Bob Young, who would play the harmonica, and was jokingly referred to as Status Quo's "unofficial fifth member".

32 years after it ended, the popularity of the "Frantic Four" lineup would see Rossi, Lancaster, Coghlan and Parfitt (as well as Young on harmonica) reuniting for a series of shows in 2013 and 14, running simultaneously with the present Quo lineup at the time.

Rossi, Lancaster, Parfitt, Kircher and Bown (1981-1985)
In 1981, Coghlan infamously quit the band after destroying his drum kit during a recording session for the 1+9+8+2 album, bringing an end to the "Frantic Four" lineup. He was replaced by Pete Kircher of Honeybus fame, while keyboardist Andy Bown, who had been working with the band as an additional musician since 1976, was made an official member of the band.

In 1982, this lineup would complete the 1+9+8+2 album and release the live album Live at the N.E.C. (originally as part of a box set titled From the Makers of... and re-released separately in 1984), with 1983 bringing another studio album entitled Back to Back, containing the Rossi/Frost single "Marguerita Time" whose pop rock direction was a point of contention for both fans of the band and Lancaster (Lancaster stating "Nobody but Francis [Rossi] wanted to record it[...] All it did was advertise that we were a bunch of nerds."). In 1984, the single "The Wanderer" gave the band a number 7 UK chart placement, with the Rossi-Lancaster-Parfitt-Kircher-Bown lineup embarking on the "End of the Road Tour" - intended as a farewell tour due to tensions within the group. However, the group was persuaded to reformed to open Bob Geldof and Midge Ure's Live Aid concert in 1985. The success of the concert saw demand for Status Quo to reform. Due to tensions, Rossi agreed on the condition that Lancaster would not return, leading to a legal battle over the Status Quo name, which Rossi and Parfitt won. Kircher would also not return.

Rossi, Parfitt, Bown and Edwards (1985-2016)
Rossi, Parfitt and Bown reformed the group with bassist John "Rhino" Edwards and drummer Jeff Rich, who had both been working with Parfitt on a never-released solo album entitled Recorded Delivery. The 31-year duration of this partnership (not counting the two changes in drummers) makes these four members the most consistent members of the band to date. Rossi, Parfitt, Bown, Edwards and Rich would release eight studio albums together, starting with In the Army Now (1986) and ending with Famous in the Last Century (2000), as well as the live album Live Alive Quo (1992), and saw hits such as "In the Army Now" (1986), "Burning Bridges (On and Off and On Again)", "The Anniversary Waltz" (1990), and "Come On You Reds", a 1994 version of "Burning Bridges" performed with the Manchester United football team, with lyrics changed to a football theme.

In April 2000, Rich retired from the group after 15 years citing family commitments, and was replaced with Matt Letley. With Letley, the group would release six studio albums starting with Heavy Traffic (2002) and ending with Bula Quo! (2013), the latter being a soundtrack album for the feature film of the same name, an adventure comedy starring Rossi and Parfitt. Letley would, in turn, announce his own retirement after 13 years in 2013, and would be replaced by current drummer Leon Cave. During 2000-2001, Bown took a hiatus from the band for personal reasons, and would be covered by Paul Hirsh of Voyager, though Bown remained an official member during this period.

In 2013 and 14, the aforementioned "Frantic Four" reunion tour took place, with the Rossi-Lancaster-Coghlan-Parfitt lineup reuniting for a UK tour (separate to the main band). Two live albums came of the tour: The Frantic Four Reunion (2013) and The Frantic Four's Final Fling.

With Cave, the group released their first acoustic album, Aquostic (Stripped Bare) in 2014, as well as a live acoustic album, Aquostic (Live at the Roundhouse) (2015). In 2016 they released the acoustic successor Aquostic II (That's a Fact!).

After a concert in Antalya, Turkey on 14 June 2016, Parfitt suffered a heart attack and was hospitalised, and retired from touring. For the remainder of the then-ongoing "Last of the Electrics" tour, Parfitt would be replaced by Edwards' son, Freddie, except for dates in July 2016 in Edinburgh and Belgium, Irish guitarist Richie Malone would fill in for Parfitt. Malone was a fan of the band, and Parfitt in particular, and had become a personal friend of them after meeting them backstage a number of times.

Rossi, Bown, Edwards, Cave and Malone (2016-present)
Parfitt died on 24 December 2016, bringing an end to an almost 50-year partnership between himself and Rossi. Malone was announced as Parfitt's permanent replacement on the band's website, and would tour with them for the remainder of their "Last of the Electrics" tour. The Rossi-Bown-Edwards-Cave-Malone lineup has thus far released three live albums: The Last Night of the Electrics (2017), Down Down & Dirty at Wacken (2018) and Down Down & Dignified at the Royal Albert Hall (2018). They released their latest album Backbone on 6 September 2019.

Current members

Former members

Touring members

Timeline 
Thinner lines indicate non-official member status as a guest or touring musician.

Lineups

References

 
Status Quo